The 1892 Hillsdale Dales  football team was an American football team that represented Hillsdale College in the 1892 college football season. The team compiled a 3–2–1 record, though two of the victories are omitted from the school's year-by-year results. In addition, the outcome of a November 24 game against Notre Dame is disputed with some sources listing it as a 12–10 victory by Hillsdale.

Schedule

References

Hillsdale
Hillsdale Chargers football seasons
Hillsdale Dales football